Eretes sticticus, the western erete, is a species of predaceous diving beetle in the family Dytiscidae. It is found in Africa, the Middle East, and the Americas from the southern United States to Peru. This species preys specifically on mosquito larvae in ponds and pools.  They can kill up to all the instar larvae of the mosquito depending on size and density of the prey.

References

Further reading

 
 
 
 
 
 
 

Dytiscidae
Beetles described in 1767
Taxa named by Carl Linnaeus